Sathyabhamakkoru Premalekhanam is a 1996 Indian Malayalam-language film directed by Rajasenan, produced by M. X. Xavier, and starring Biju Menon, Prem Kumar, Chandni and Indrans. Actors Chandni Shaju and Ramachandran first introduced in this movie. The film has a musical score by Rajamani.

Cast
 Biju Menon as Sethumadhavan 
 Chandni Shaju as Sathyabhama
 Indrans as Purshotthaman 
 K. T. S. Padannayil as Moothakunnath Vikramadithya Varma 
 Oduvil Unnikrishnan as Wariyar 
 Paravoor Ramachandran as Chandramangalathu Rama Varma
 Maniyanpilla Raju as Sambhu, Aniyan Thamburan
 Zainuddin as Aniyan, Aniyan Thamburan
 Prem Kumar as Bruce Lee Bhaskaran 
 Rajan P. Dev as Kovai Machan
 Mala Aravindan as Koduval Prakasan
 Vettukili Prakash as Karadi Narayanan
 Jose Pellissery as Vallyaveedan
 Kalabhavan Haneef as Vallyaveedan's Right Hand
 Zeenath as Subhadra, Aniyan's Wife
 Kanakalatha as Kochammini, Sambhu's Wife
 Priyanka Anoop as Karadi Narayanan's Wife
 T. R. Omana as Rama Varma's Wife
 Khadeeja as Kuttimalu, Rama Varma's Eldest Sister
 Renuka as Svitri, Rama Varma's Youngest Sister
 Madhupal as Indrajith
 Spadikam George as Chandrasekara Varma
 K. R. Vatsala as Chandrasekara Varma's Wife

Soundtrack
The music was composed by Rajamani and the lyrics were written by I. S. Kundoor and S. Ramesan Nair.

References

External links
 

1996 films
1990s Malayalam-language films
Malayalam films remade in other languages
Films directed by Rajasenan